This is a list of diplomatic missions in Saint Vincent and the Grenadines.  At present, the capital city of Kingstown hosts 4 embassies/high commissions.  Several other countries have honorary consuls to provide emergency services to their citizens.

Embassies/High Commissions 
Kingstown

Non-resident embassies/high commissions 

 (Caracas)
 (Port of Spain)
 (Port of Spain)
 (Bogotá)
 (Kingston)
 (Bridgetown)
 (Bridgetown)
 (Kingston)
 (Port of Spain)
 (Mexico City)
 (Mexico City)
 (Caracas)
 (Havana)
 (New York City)
 (Bridgetown)
 (Caracas)
 (Castries)
 (Port of Spain)
 (Havana)
 (New York City)
 (Port-of-Spain)
 (Santo Domingo)
 (New York City)
 (Caracas)
 (New York City)
 (Santo Domingo)
 (Caracas)
 (Havana)
 (Port of Spain)
 (Washington, D.C.)
 (Havana)
 (Caracas)
 (Castries)
 (Washington, D.C.)
 (Havana)
 (Havana)
 (Washington, D.C.)
 (Havana)
 (Caracas)
 (Castries)
 (New York City)
 (Castries)
 (Caracas)
 (Port of Spain)
 (Port of Spain)
 (New York City)
 (Caracas)
 (Washington, D.C.)
 (Caracas)
 (Caracas)
 (Georgetown)
 (Caracas)
 (Washington DC)
 (Havana)
 (New York City)
 (Kingston)
 (Port of Spain)
 (Port of Spain)
 (Caracas)
 (Stockholm)
 (Havana)
 (Washington, D.C.)
 (Washington, D.C.)
 (Washington, D.C.)
 (Ottawa)
 (New York City)
 (Washington, D.C.)
 (New York City)
 (Port of Spain)
 (Washington, D.C.)
 (Bogota)
 (Bridgetown)
 (New York City)
 (New York City)
 (Caracas)
 (Havana)
 (Ottawa)
 (Washington, D.C.)

See also
Foreign relations of Saint Vincent and the Grenadines
List of diplomatic missions of Saint Vincent and the Grenadines

References

Foreign relations of Saint Vincent and the Grenadines
Saint Vincent and the Grenadines
Diplomatic
Diplomatic missions